Half-Pipe Hustle was the first official FIRST Vex Challenge (FVC) game, taking place in 2005–2006. In this challenge, robotics teams built robots from the Vex design kit to compete in competitions across the United States and in other nations, in matches consisting of a 45-second autonomous period, followed by a 2-minute driver control period in which the robots are controlled by team drivers using remote controls.

The game

The teams were put into two-team alliances, with two alliances competing against each other in each match, one being the red alliance, and the other the blue alliance. During the autonomous period, teams' robots competed for 45 seconds without operator control, relying only upon sensor input and programming to score points. The 8' x 12' competition field consisted of a wooden ramp at either end of the field, forming a rough half-pipe shape. The team members stood at either end of the field. The main playing elements were blue and red racquetballs. On the foam field floor, two lines of blue and two lines of red racquetballs were arranged. Mounted on the walls closest to the teams' operators were four ball dispensers, each with 15 balls. Dispensers with like-colored balls were placed on opposite sides of the field, as were the lines of balls. Corner goals were placed at the corners of the field, with three-inch walls to hold racquetballs. In the operator control period, a triangular high goal was present at the center of the field. From the three sides, thin eighteen-inch square platforms extended. In the autonomous period, there were four platforms and the center goal was square and divided into quadrants, with the walls at 45° angles to the field's walls. Also, the field was divided by wooden walls into quadrants. White lines of tape were placed on the field for the autonomous period to allow for strategic line following by the robots.

Robot Rules
The competition robots could not exceed 18" in width or length, or 12" in height. The teams were not allowed to introduce a new robot into the game during any time of the match. No two identical robots were allowed on the match. Upon entering the match, all robots had to pass an inspection, and if modified immensely, must be reinspected. The robots could only contain Vex parts, or other, specially allowed parts, and could not be potentially damaging to the playing field, other robots, or the players.

Scoring
During the autonomous period, it was possible for each team to earn a total of 60 points. During the operator control period, each alliance could earn a total of 90 points. To be parked on a white platform, a robot could not be touching the field's foam mats. To "own" a goal, a team or alliance needed to have more of its color balls that its opponents' in that goal.

Autonomous Period
 Each racquetball in a side goal was worth 1 point.
 Each racquetball in the center goal was worth 2 points.
 A robot parked on a white platform at the end of the autonomous period was worth 10 points.

Operator Control Period
 Each racquetball in any goal was worth 1 point.
 A robot parked on a white platform at the end of the operator control period was worth 10 points.
 Owning a corner goal was worth 5 points.
 Owning the high goal was worth 10 points.

See also
 FTC

References

External links
 
 FTC Challenge

2005 in robotics